Ailly-sur-Somme (literally Ailly on Somme) is a commune in the Somme department in Hauts-de-France in northern France.

Geography
The town is 5 miles to the west of Amiens, in the valley of the Somme.
Served by the N235 national road. Ailly-sur-Somme station has rail connections to Amiens and Abbeville.

History
 Around 1850 : Implementation along the Somme, of jute processing factories.
 11 juillet 1906 : Renowned Paris-Basle passenger train accident

Population

Personality
 James Carmichaël, Scottish industrialist, who installed rope-making equipment.

See also
Communes of the Somme department

References

External links

(All French language)
 Ailly-sur-Somme and the Paris-Basle train derailment, July 11, 1906

Communes of Somme (department)